Jan Theodorus 'Theo' Jansen van Rensburg (born 26 August 1967, in Carletonville), is a former South African rugby union player who played for the South Africa national rugby union team. He played as fullback.

Playing career

Provincial rugby

Van Rensburg represented Western Transvaal at the Craven Week for High Schools in 1984 and 1985 and also represented Western Transvaal at under–20 level. In 1989 he made his senior provincial debut for Northern Transvaal. Van Rensburg relocated to Transvaal in 1992 and made his Springboks debut as a Transvaal player. He moved back to Northern Transvaal in 1995, after which he also played for Eastern Province and South Western Districts.

Springboks

He played his first test match for the Springboks on 15 Augustus 1992 against New Zealand at Ellis Park in Johannesburg. At the end of 1992 Van Rensburg toured with the Springboks to France and England, but played in only one test on tour, that against England. Van Rensburg also toured with the Springboks to Australia in 1993 and as a replacement, to New Zealand in 1994. His last test was on 23 July 1994 against New Zealand at Athletic Park in Wellington. He scored 40 points (12 penalties, 2 conversions) in test matches for the Springboks and also played in 15 tour matches scoring 142 points (7 tries, 19 conversions, 22 penalties and 1 drop goal).

Test history 

Legend: pen = penalty (3 pts.); conv = conversion (2 pts.), drop = drop kick (3 pts.).

Accolades
Van Rensburg was voted as one of the five Young Players of the Year for 1990, along with Andrew Aitken, Jannie Claassens, Bernard Fourie and Ian MacDonald.

See also

List of South Africa national rugby union players – Springbok no. 558

References

External links
espnscrum.com Theo van Rensburg

South African rugby union players
South Africa international rugby union players
1967 births
Living people
Rugby union players from Gauteng
Rugby union fullbacks